John Frederick George Godfrey (19 November 1910 – 24 April 1989) was an Australian rules footballer who played with Footscray in the Victorian Football League (VFL).

Notes

External links 

1910 births
1989 deaths
VFL/AFL players born outside Australia
Australian rules footballers from Victoria (Australia)
Western Bulldogs players